Expedition of Zayd ibn Harithah in al-Jumum took place in September 627 (AH 6).

Zayd ibn Harithah was the freed slave and the adopted son of Muhammad. A platoon, under the leadership of Zayd ibn Harithah, was sent to Al Jumum, the habitation of Banu Salim, in the same year. A group of non-Muslims were captured. A woman from Banu Muzaina was also captured, and she showed them the way to the enemy’s camp. There the Muslims took some captives and gained a lot of booty. Later on, Muhammad granted the woman her freedom and married her to one of his followers.

See also
Military career of Muhammad
List of expeditions of Muhammad
Muslim–Quraysh War

Notes

627
Campaigns ordered by Muhammad